Isabelle Valentin (born 20 January 1962 in Le Puy-en-Velay) is a French politician of the Republicans who has been serving as a member of the National Assembly since 28 June 2017, representing the 1st constituency of Haute-Loire.

Political career
Valentin was elected a Rhône-Alpes regional councillor in 2010 and then an Auvergne-Rhône-Alpes regional councillor in 2015.

In parliament, Valentin has been a member of the Committee on Social Affairs.

Political positions
In the Republicans' 2017 leadership election, Valentin endorsed Laurent Wauquiez as the party's chairman.

References

1962 births
Living people
People from Le Puy-en-Velay
The Republicans (France) politicians
Deputies of the 15th National Assembly of the French Fifth Republic
Women members of the National Assembly (France)
21st-century French women politicians
Deputies of the 16th National Assembly of the French Fifth Republic